Integrated Rural Technology Centre is an independent Research and Development organization founded by Kerala Sathra Sahithya Parishad and a grant-in-aid institute of Kerala State Council for Science Technology and Education, Government of Kerala. The institution was established in 1987 and is located at Palakkad district in Kerala.

IRTC has been at the forefront of rural innovation in the country, with several products and ideas contributing to enhance the lives of rural poor. The aim of this organization is to spread Science and Technology among masses and to create a technology- human interface. The institution is constantly working to meet the challenges in front and find amicable and sustainable solutions to improve the standard of life.

IRTC has played a significant role in handholding the local self-government institutions across the state through their project implementation and consultancy support for preparing Detailed Project Reports for various developmental programmes. IRTC has extensively involved in research, innovation and extension activities to empower the marginalized communities across the state. It has contributed much in the areas of women and child development with the collaboration of national and international agencies such as WHO, UNICEF, UNDP, NABARD, DST, DBT, KILA, etc.

IRTC is a Centre of Excellence in Waste Management and an accredited agency of Government of Kerala for preparing watershed DPR.

Major Divisions 

 Solid waste management
 Natural Resource Management with a focus on watershed development
 Energy management
 Social Science
 Livelihood

Area of work 
Smokeless chulha, hotbox, small hydel projects in Meenvallom and Palakuzhi, grassroots planning initiatives, resource mapping, farmer-producer collectives, Solid Waste Management, Biogas plants, experiments with inoculum, Resource Mapping, Application of GIS and remote sensing tools in resource mapping, watershed based development and natural disaster management, Watershed Based Development, Rural Engineering, Chemical Analysis, Gender Studies, Rabbit rearing, Aquaculture, Ornamental Fisheries, Mushroom Culture, Post-Harvest Technologies, Fruit Processing, Biomass Gasification, Planning & Development Consultancy, Education Research and Intervention, Electronic Ballast, Compact Fluorescent Lamps, Portable Domestic Biogas Plants, Small Hydro Power Projects, Solar Driers, Mechanised Potter's Wheel, Pug Mill, etc. have made an impact on rural lives.

Sister Concerns 

 Project Implementation Unit (PIU)
 Parishad Production Centre (PPC)

Facilities 

 IRTC Laboratory
 Soil, Water and Compost testing facilities
 Library
 GIS and Remote Sensing Laboratory
 Automatic Weather Station
 Mushroom, Fisheries and Aquaculture unit
 Trainings  and student internships
 Food and accommodation
 Campus visits

Gallery

References

External links 

 IRTC website
 KSSP Website
 Friends of KSSP Website
 KSSP Thuravoor Unit
Samata Products Website

Research institutes in Kerala
1987 establishments in Kerala
Rural development organisations in India
Education in Palakkad